Coumeenoole is a village in County Kerry, Ireland. It is located on Slea Head, on the Dingle Peninsula , to the west of Dingle. Due to its location on the coast, the town and beaches are a tourist destination.

The town is connected to Dingle via the R559 regional road.

See also 

 List of towns and villages in Ireland

References 

Towns and villages in County Kerry